Gnesta Municipality (Gnesta kommun) is a municipality in Södermanland County in southeast Sweden. Its seat is located in the town of Gnesta, with some 5,000 inhabitants.

The present municipality was created in 1992, when Nyköping Municipality (of which it had been a part since 1974) was split up.

It is in the middle of the cultural Södermanland province. Although it only has around 10,000 permanent inhabitants, the population increases substantially in the summer due to the many summer houses.

Industry-wise, Gnesta mostly has small companies with few employed. There are about 800 registered companies in the municipality, and a "large" company would have 25-50 employees.

Localities
From Statistics Sweden, 2004.

Gnesta has about 5,000 inhabitants
Björnlunda 760
Stjärnhov 573

Geography

Notable Events
Gnesta became Hedestad when Stieg Larsson's book, The Girl with the Dragon Tattoo, was made into a film. Filming took place in April 2008. The film premiered worldwide, and in Gnesta, on 27 February 2009.

Elections

Riksdag
The results of Sweden Democrats were not published by SCB at a municipal level between 1991 and 1998 due to the party's small size at a nationwide level.

Blocs

This lists the relative strength of the socialist and centre-right blocs since 1991, but parties not elected to the Riksdag are inserted as "other", including the Sweden Democrats results from 1988 to 2006 but also the Greens in 1991. The sources are identical to the table above. The coalition or government mandate marked in bold formed the government after the election. New Democracy got elected in 1991 but are still listed as "other" due to the short lifespan of the party. "Elected" is the total number of percentage points from the municipality that went to parties who were elected to the Riksdag.

Demographics

2022
This is a demographic table based on Gnesta Municipality's electoral districts in the 2022 Swedish general election sourced from SVT's election platform, in turn taken from SCB official statistics.

Residents include everyone registered as living in the district, regardless of age or citizenship status. Valid voters indicate Swedish citizens above the age of 18 who therefore can vote in general elections. Left vote and right vote indicate the result between the two major blocs in said district in the 2022 general election. Employment indicates the share of people between the ages of 20 and 64 who are working taxpayers. Foreign background denotes residents either born abroad or with two parents born outside of Sweden. Median income is the received monthly income through either employment, capital gains or social grants for the median adult above 20, also including pensioners in Swedish kronor. College graduates indicates any degree accumulated after high school.

In total there were 11,501 residents, of which 8,615 were Swedish citizens of voting age. 49.7 % voted for the left coalition and 48.8 % for the right coalition.

Sister cities
Gnesta has two sister cities, both with around 6,000 inhabitants:
Saulkrasti, Latvia
Sundsøre Municipality, Denmark

References

External links

Gnesta Municipality - Official site

Municipalities of Södermanland County